Acerentomon pannonicum is a species of proturan in the family Acerentomidae. It is found in Europe and Northern Asia (excluding China).

References

Further reading

 

Protura
Animals described in 1966